Andújar is a city in Andalusia, Spain.

Andújar may also refer to:

Andújar Cedeño (1969–2000), Dominican Major League Baseball player
Claudia Andujar (born 1931), Swiss-born Brazilian photographer and indigenous rights activist
Joaquín Andújar (1952–2015), Dominican Major League Baseball player
Pablo Andújar (born 1986), Spanish tennis player
Mariano Andújar (born 1983), Argentine football goalkeeper
Miguel Andújar, (born 1995), Dominican Major League Baseball player
Stephanie Andujar (born 1986), American actress